The Drosophila immigrans species group is a polyphyletic and speciose lineage of Drosophila flies, including over 100 species. Immigrans species belong to the Immigrans-tripunctata radiation of the subgenus Drosophila. Well-described species include Drosophila immigrans, and the sister species Drosophila albomicans and Drosophila nasuta. The genome of D. albomicans was sequenced in 2012 in an effort to characterize novel sex chromosome development in D. albomicans. Immigrans group species are related to mushroom-breeding Drosophila of the Quinaria and Testacea species groups.

Subgroups
The Immigrans species group can be further divided into four subgroups:

 Immigrans subgroup: includes D. immigrans
 Nasuta subgroup: includes D. albomicans and D. nasuta
 Hypocausta subgroup
 Quadrilineata subgroup

Notes
 Bachtrog and Vicoso. 2015. "Numerous Transitions of Sex Chromosomes in Diptera." PLoS Biology, 13(4), e1002078
 Katoh et al. 2007. "Phylogeny of the Drosophila immigrans Species Group (Diptera: Drosophilidae) Based on Adh and Gpdh Sequences." Zoolog Sci. 24(9):913-21.

References

immigrans
Insect species groups
Polyphyletic groups